Lycée School, Kolkata is a southern Kolkata based privately owned and administered all-grade co-educational primary, secondary and higher secondary school providing education from Lower Nursery to Class - 12. Previously affiliated with the Council for the Indian School Certificate Examinations, the school has recently shifted its affiliation to the West Bengal Board of Secondary Education and the West Bengal Council of Higher Secondary Education respectively, contrasting a general trend to switch affiliation to a national school board from state based boards in India.

Notable alumni
Anweshaa
June Malia

See also
Education in India
List of schools in India
Education in West Bengal

References

External links
 

Primary schools in West Bengal
High schools and secondary schools in Kolkata
Educational institutions established in 1982
1982 establishments in West Bengal
Educational institutions in India with year of establishment missing